A Suurkilpailu (Grand Race) is a harness racing event in Finland in which the purse for the winner is at or over 10,000 Euros (approximately 13,500 USD). All Grand Races are authorised by the  Finnish trotting and breeding association, the central horse organisation of Finland. The most important Grand Races are Finlandia-Ajo, St Michel and Kymi Grand Prix.

Events for light trotters

Notes
Name may change according to the main sponsor.
Prizes determined separately; according to the Suurkilpailu bylaws, the winner purse will be at or over 10,000 EUR.

Events for coldblood trotters

Notes
Prizes determined separately; according to the Suurkilpailu bylaws, the winner purse will be at or over 10,000 EUR.
Name may change according to the main sponsor.

Notes

Harness racing in Finland